Lymm Urban District is a former Urban District in Cheshire, based in the village of Lymm. It was created in 1894 and abolished in 1974 when it was incorporated into the Borough of Warrington. The area is now covered by a successor parish council.

References

Districts of England created by the Local Government Act 1894
Districts of England abolished by the Local Government Act 1972
History of Cheshire
Urban districts of England
Former districts of Cheshire